The Legend of 1900 ('The Legend of the Pianist on the Ocean') is a 1998 Italian drama film directed by Giuseppe Tornatore and starring Tim Roth, Pruitt Taylor Vince and Mélanie Thierry. It was Tornatore's first English-language film. The film is inspired by Novecento, a monologue by Alessandro Baricco. The film was nominated for a variety of awards worldwide, winning several for its soundtrack.

Plot
The story is told in the midst of the plot as a series of flashbacks. Max Tooney, a musician, enters a secondhand music shop just before closing time, badly in need of money. He has only his old Conn trumpet, which he sells for less than he had hoped. Clearly torn at parting from his prized possession, he asks to play it one last time. The shopkeeper agrees, and as he plays, the vendor immediately recognizes that the played song is the same recorded on a broken record matrix (master disc) he found inside a recently acquired secondhand piano. He asks who the piece is by, and Max tells him the story of 1900.

1900 was found abandoned in the first class dining room of the four stacker ocean liner SS Virginian, a baby in a box. Danny Boodman, a coal-man from the boiler room, is determined to raise the boy as his own. He names the boy Danny Boodman T. D. Lemon 1900 (a combination of his own name, an advertisement found on the box and the year he was found) and hides him from the ship's officers. A few years later Danny is killed in a workplace accident; when police officers, called by captain Smith, come on the ship to pick him up and bring him to the orphanage, 1900 hides and nobody sees him for several days, until he reappears playing a piano very well without having ever been taught.

1900 shows a particular gift for music and eventually grows up, joining the ship's orchestra. When Max is hired as a member of the orchestra in 1927, the two musicians become close friends, with 1900 that never leaves the vessel. The outside world is too "big" for his imagination at this point. He stays current with outside musical trends as passengers explain new music trends or styles, which he immediately picks up and starts playing for them.

His reputation as a pianist is so renowned that Jelly Roll Morton, of New Orleans jazz fame, hearing of 1900's skill, comes aboard to challenge him to a piano duel. After hearing Jelly Roll Morton's first tune, 1900 plays a piece so simple and well known ("Silent Night") that the self-proclaimed inventor of jazz feels mocked. As Morton becomes more determined to display his talent, he plays an impressive tune ("The Crave") that brings tears to 1900's eyes. 1900 calmly sits down at the piano and plays from memory the entire tune that Morton had just played. His playing fails to impress the crowd until his original piece ("Enduring Movement"), of such virtuosity and superhuman speed that the metal piano strings become hot enough to light a cigarette, which he hands to Morton as a gesture of victory.

A record producer, hearing of 1900's prowess and knowing that he doesn't want to leave the ship, brings a recording apparatus aboard and cuts a demo record of a 1900 original composition. He creates the piece, inspired by a woman (The Girl) who has just boarded and mesmerizes him. When he hears the recording, 1900 takes the master disc, offended at the prospect of anyone hearing the music without him having performed it live. He then tries to give the master to The Girl who inspired it, but is unable to and breaks it into pieces.

The story flashes back to the mid-1940s periodically, as Max (who has left the ship's orchestra in 1933) is seen trying to lure 1900 out of the now-deserted hull of the vessel, because the shopkeeper has revealed that the piano where the record had been found was recovered from the ship. Having served as a hospital ship and transport in World War II, it is scheduled to be scuttled and sunk far offshore. Max manages to get aboard with the recording 1900 made long ago and plays it, hoping to find him out. Max and 1900 finally meet again and 1900 is irremovable about sinking with the ship, being daunted by the immenseness of the world. He feels his fate is tied to the ship, and cannot bring himself to leave the only home he has ever known. Max feels useless that he couldn't save his friend and the two have a touching last conversation.

The shopkeeper asks Max how the record got into the secondhand piano. Max indicates that he put it there, and the shopkeeper tells him he wasn't so useless after all. Then, as Max is leaving the store, the shopkeeper gives him the trumpet back, without asking for money and saying "A good story is worth more than an old trumpet," and Max walks out as another customer walks in.

Cast

 Tim Roth as 1900 (Danny Boodman T.D. Lemon 1900)
 Roman Kuznietcov as 2 year-old 1900
 Easton Gage as 4-year-old 1900
 Cory Buck as 8-year-old 1900
 Pruitt Taylor Vince as Max Tooney
 Mélanie Thierry as The Girl
 Bill Nunn as Danny
 Heathcote Williams as Dr. Klauserman
 Clarence Williams III as Jelly Roll Morton
 Peter Vaughan as The Shopkeeper
 Niall O'Brien as Harbor Master
 Gabriele Lavia as Farmer
 Sidney Cole as Musician
 Harry Ditson as Captain Smith
 Adrian McCourt
 Kevin McNally
 Eamon Geoghegan

Reception
The Legend of 1900 received mixed critical reviews. On Rotten Tomatoes the film has an approval rating of 54% based on 41 reviews. On Metacritic, the film has a 58/100 rating based on 28 critics, indicating "mixed or average reviews".

The film grossed $4 million in Italy and $259,127 in the United States. On 15 November 2019 the film was given a wide release in China and made 130 million yuan (the equivalent of about $18.4 million) in its first two weeks.

Soundtrack

Accolades

References

External links

 
 
 
 

1998 films
1998 romantic drama films
Italian romantic drama films
1990s English-language films
English-language Italian films
1990s French-language films
Films directed by Giuseppe Tornatore
Films scored by Ennio Morricone
Films about pianos and pianists
Italian films based on plays
Films set in the 1920s
Films set on ships
Films shot in Rome
Films shot in Ukraine